There have been three Evelyn Baronetcies, two in the Baronetage of England and one in the Baronetage of Great Britain. These are shown individually below in order of creation.

Evelyn of Godstone, Surrey

Created in the Baronetage of England 29 May 1660 for
Sir John Evelyn, 1st Baronet (12 March 1633 – 10 August 1671) High Sheriff of Surrey 1666
Extinct on his death

Evelyn of Long Ditton, Surrey
Created in the Baronetage of England 17 February 1683 for
Sir Edward Evelyn, 1st Baronet MP for Surrey 1685–1687 (25 January 1626 – 3 May 1692)
Extinct on his death

Evelyn of Wotton, Surrey
Created in the Baronetage of Great Britain on 6 August 1713 for:
Sir John Evelyn, 1st Baronet (1 March 1682 – 15 July 1763), MP for Helston 1708–1710, Joint Postmaster General 1708–1715, grandson of John Evelyn, the diarist. He was succeeded by his son:
Sir John Evelyn, 2nd Baronet (24 August 1706 – 11 June 1767), MP for Helston 1727–1741 and 1747–1767 and Penryn 1741–1747. He was succeeded by his son:
Sir Frederick Evelyn, 3rd Baronet (1734 – 1 April 1812). On his death, the baronetcy passed to his cousin:
Sir John Evelyn, 4th Baronet (c. 1758 – 14 May 1833). When he killed a postman, he was declared of unsound mind (28 July 1795) and spent the rest of his life in prison. He was succeeded by his brother:
Sir Hugh Evelyn, 5th Baronet (31 January 1769 – 28 August 1848). He spent eighteen years in prison for a debt of £30. :The baronetcy became extinct on the death of the fifth baronet.

References

External links
 

Extinct baronetcies in the Baronetage of England
Extinct baronetcies in the Baronetage of Great Britain